Janków Pierwszy  is a village in the administrative district of Gmina Blizanów, within Kalisz County, Greater Poland Voivodeship, in west-central Poland.

The village has a population of 200.

Schools
The School Complex in Janków Pierwszy, with its original name Zespół Szkół w Jankowie Pierwszym, is the only educational institution in Janków Pierwszy. It consists of The Public Local Kindergarten, The Primary School and The Junior High School. 

Here is an historical overview of the progress of schools: 

1945–1946: The authorities of the Blizanów commune decide to build a school in Jankow Pierwszy.

1952: The ceremonial opening of the institution.

1958: A kindergarten was opened.

1959: First graduates finish school.

1963–1973: The Agricultural Pre-school operates in the building.

1974–1975: The school becomes a Collective School of Communes with branches in: Żerniki, Lip, Brudzew, Jarantów and Piskory.

1982: Installation of central heating.

1984: Subsequent changes in the school's activity - the Collective Community School becomes the Primary School again.

1997: The commune council of Blizanów decides to establish a School Complex, which includes: Primary School and Public Local Kindergarten

1999: The School Complex in Janków Pierwszy grew by the Junior High School.

2001–2003: Modernization of the school, which included insulation, a new elevation of the building, replacement of windows and door carpentry, renovation inside the building.

2004–2005: Expansion of the school: modernization of central heating from coal to oil.

2006: Putting into use a full-size Junior High School with facilities.

2008: Putting into use a multi-purpose pitch with a tartan surface and parking for teachers and parents.

2009: Modernization of the school in the field of electrical installation replacement.

2010: Putting into use a multi-functional sports Complex with a tartan track and a long jump.

References

Villages in Kalisz County